Anne Bartsch (born 22 September 1995) is a German ice hockey player for the Eisbären Juniors Berlin and the German national team.

She participated at the 2015 IIHF Women's World Championship.

References

External links

1995 births
Living people
German women's ice hockey forwards
German expatriate ice hockey people
German expatriate sportspeople in Sweden
People from Zittau
Sportspeople from Saxony